Biman Bose (born July 1, 1938) is an Indian politician who was once state Secretary of the West Bengal Communist Party of India (Marxist). He was later succeeded by his trusted aide, Surya Kanta Mishra, although he remained a Politburo member of the party. He is also Chairman of the Left Front committee of West Bengal.

Early life 
Biman Bose was an alumnus of Maulana Azad College, under the University of Calcutta. During his educational experience, Bose was known to be involved in political and social activities. He participated in an election campaign during an assembly by-election in 1954, while he was still in school.

Though he was recommended for Party in 1957, he was not granted a position until 1958 due to the minimum age requirement being 18 years old. He participated in the movement against Bengal-Bihar merger in 1956 as well as the food movement in 1959, and was imprisoned in 1958.

Early political life 
Bose was elected Secretary of the Bengal Provincial Students' Federation, Kolkata district, and vice-president of the BPSF in 1964. Bose carried on his work as the Assistant Secretary of Indo-Vietnam Solidarity Committee in the mid-1960s.

He was the first All India Secretary of Students Federation of India in 1970. He continued in that position until 1976. He became a member of the West Bengal State Committee of Communist Party of India (Marxist) in 1971 and a Secretariat member in 1978. He was mentored by Pramod Dasgupta.

Political career
He was made a permanent invitee to the CPI (M) Central Committee in 1983 and was elected as a regular member of the in 1985. He was elected as a member of the Politburo in 1998.

He played a key role in building and organizing the party in several parts of West Bengal, especially undivided Medinipur, Bankura and Puruliya districts.

He was also elected as the Chairman of Left Front (West Bengal) in 1998, after Sailen Dasgupta was relieved of the post due to health issues. This was the first time since 1977, that a person who was not the state Secretary of CPI (M) became chair of the Left Front.
 
Bose was also elected as state Secretary of CPI(M) in March 2005 after Anil Biswas died suddenly. He served in the position until 2015 when Surjya Kanta Mishra succeeded him.

In 2022, he left the State Secretariat, State Committee, the Central Committee and the Politburo of CPI(M) in one go adhering to the party's strict age-limit. However, he is still serving as the Chairperson of Left Front.

Later in 2022, he was made a special invitee to the central and state committee of CPI(M).

References 

Once upon a time Biman Bose fall in love.

Communist Party of India (Marxist) politicians from West Bengal
Living people
Maulana Azad College alumni
University of Calcutta alumni
1940 births
Politicians from Kolkata